is a quiet residential district of Meguro, Tokyo, Japan, and, most notably, is home to its landmark Yebisu Garden Place. Distinct from another district Mita, Minato, Tokyo, the district is sometimes referred to as Meguro-Mita.

As a part of Yebisu Garden Place, Tokyo Metropolitan Museum of Photography is located in Mita.

The district borders Ebisu and Ebisuminami on the north; Kamiōsaki on the east; Meguro on the south and (across Meguro River) on the west; and Nakameguro on the northwest.

Education
Meguro City Board of Education operates public elementary and junior high schools.

All of Mita (1-2 chōme) is zoned to Dendo Elementary School (田道小学校) and Otori Junior High School (大鳥中学校).

References

Neighborhoods of Tokyo
Meguro